

External links 
IMDB listing for German films made in 1943
filmportal.de listing for films made in 1943

German
Lists of German films

film